Calliope Click is the seventh studio album by American rapper C-Murder, released on September 29, 2009 on TRU Records and RBC Records. It was produced by Ben Grossi, Bob Grossi, and Brian Shafton.

Track listing
"Intro" — 0:27
"I'm Down" — 4:32
"No Pressure" (featuring Sincere Sosa & Jason Lyric) — 5:04
"It's So Hard" (featuring Jahbo) — 4:54
"Real Click" (featuring Holidae & Jason Lyric) — 4:24
"100 All Time" (featuring Holidae) — 3:54
"Come Roll with Me" (featuring Snoop Dogg & Jahbo) — 4:57
"Get It On" (featuring Als & Holidae) — 4:22
"Choppers" (featuring Big B & Pukie) — 3:51
"N.O. in Me" (featuring Juvenile & B.G.) — 3:59
"Hate on Me" (featuring Holidae) — 4:54
"The Life I Live" (featuring Jahbo) — 3:03
"My Hustle" (featuring Pukie, Sincere Sosa & Jahbo) — 4:50
"Real Where I Live" (featuring Macho, Duggum-D & Bop) — 5:20
"My City" (featuring M11 & Young Trump) — 5:18
"Carrin' da Hawk" (featuring Holidae, Macho & Malachi) — 4:00
"Streets Made Me" (featuring Lil' Real One) — 4:37
"I Don't Understand" (featuring T'Glok, Yung Milly & Yella) — 4:58

Charts

Credits

References

C-Murder albums
2009 albums